Al-Ghazi Tractors Ltd (AGTL) is a Pakistani agricultural machinery manufacturer headquartered in Karachi with a tractor manufacturing plant located in Dera Ghazi Khan, Pakistan. It is the manufacturer of New Holland tractors in Pakistan with the production capacity of 30,000. 
Al-Ghazi Tractors is one of the two major tractor manufacturers of Pakistan with a 29 percent market share in 2021.

The company is a subsidiary of American machinery manufacturer CNH Industrial and Emirati conglomerate Al-Futtaim Group.

History
The company was founded in 1983 and started production at its plant located in Dera Ghazi Khan.

In 1991, Al-Futtaim Group took over the management control of Al-Ghazi Tractors by acquiring 50 percent of its shares.

This legit company is listed on the Pakistan Stock Exchange.

Products
Al-Ghazi produced a wide range of models which include:
 Ghazi
480S
 640
 NH 70-56
NH Dabung 85

Al Ghazi also produces generators and farming equipment.

See also
 List of tractor manufacturers

References

External links

 

CNH Industrial
Tractor manufacturers of Pakistan
Manufacturing companies based in Karachi
Vehicle manufacturing companies established in 1983
Pakistani companies established in 1983
1991 mergers and acquisitions
Companies listed on the Pakistan Stock Exchange
Dera Ghazi Khan District
Formerly government-owned companies of Pakistan